Vikrant Rona is a 2022 Indian Kannada-language action thriller film written and directed by Anup Bhandari, produced by Jack Manjunath and co-produced by Alankar Pandian. It stars Sudeepa in the title role with Nirup Bhandari, Neetha Ashok, and Jacqueline Fernandez. The story revolves around Inspector Vikrant Rona, who arrives at a remote village in the middle of a tropical rainforest where he starts witnessing a series of unexplainable events which are attributed to the supernatural.

Vikrant Rona was released theatrically in 3D on 28 July 2022, and digitally in ZEE5 on 2 September 2022. The film received mixed to negative reviews from critics but received positive response from audience and thus became the third highest-grossing Kannada film at the time of its release.

Plot 
Film opens with some children reading story books. One of them goes on to read a story about a Brahmarakshas in a village called Kamarottu, who was known to kidnap and kill children, fearing whom children would not venture outside after it was dark. The story goes on to show a kid being kidnapped by an eerie figure in eerie circumstances.

The next day, we are introduced to the villagers. In the village of Kamarottu, which is situated in Karnataka, Janardhan Gambira is a short-tempered landlord who lives with his wife Santha "Shaku" and his brother Eknath. Janardhan's friend's son, Vishwanath Ballal, arrives at the village with his wife and two children, Aparna "Panna" and Mohanchandra "Munna". Vishwanath tells Janardhan that Panna is engaged to one Rakesh and that he wants to arrange the marriage in their ancestral Kamarottu house, but Janardhan refuses, as the house is haunted by the brahmarakshasa. This is due to his son, Sanjeev "Sanju", having stolen jewels from the village's temple, 28 years ago. We are shown that Sanju, who had been gone from the village for 28 years, had sent a telegram to his ailing mother that he would come to see her soon. That same night, Sanju arrives at the village, from London. He meets Panna at Kamarottu house entrance, and they both accidentally find the beheaded corpse of a cop named Suresh Krishna, in the house well.

After this incident, Inspector Vikrant Rona accompanied by his little daughter Guddi, arrives at the village to investigate, where an attempt is made to kill him, but Vikrant manages to escape. Upon taking charge, Vikrant reaches the Kamarottu house, where after inspecting the well, he finds the dead cop's purse with a  note in it. Vikrant heads to the forest to find the culprit, where another attempt is made to kill him, but he manages to defeat the attackers, who escape. Vikrant tries to capture them, but finds a child hanging at a tree, and a watch, belonging to Suresh Krishna. After inspecting the corpse, Vikrant finds a parchment, which has: Gara Gara Gara Gaggara Jarba, Pira Nalkuri Netthara Parba written on it and weird make-up on the face of the corpse. Vikrant learns that 14 children were also previously killed in the same manner. He learns that almost all of them were students at the local school in the village, which is being run by P.E. teacher, Lawrence Pinto. He visits the school and conducts primary enquiry. Vikrant is informed of a local smuggler Moosa Kunni by the PE Teacher, and Vikrant secures his whereabouts from Rakkamma, a local liquor shop owner.

Fascinated by the recent turn of events, Panna decides to investigate the murders as well. This leads to her finding an old lady in the haunted ancestral house and Suresh Krishna's head in a box. Panna inquires about the old lady named Deyyu, where she finds out that she is Nittoni's mother. Nittoni was the caretaker of the village's temple, who was framed by Janardhan and Vishwanath, for stealing the temple jewelry (which was done by Sanju), due to which Nittoni, along with his wife and children: Madhava, Raghava and his younger daughter committed suicide out of shame, leaving Deyyu insane. Vikrant learns that the place where the child was hung, is owned by the smuggler, Moose Kunni. He brings him in for interrogation, but to no avail. While roaming in the forest, Panna and Munna find a devil-like figure, with a finger wound, keeping his hands near a fire. She complains to Vikrant about this, but finds a similar finger wound on his hand, which makes her suspect that Vikrant is the devil and that he might be connected to Nittoni's family. When she along with Sanju reaches Vikrant's house that evening, they see Vikrant dressed in a costume with the same weird make-up on his face. Vikrant arrives at Moose Kunni's factory and thrashes the workers, along with hanging and killing Moose Kunni. Vikrant meets Sanju and Panna, who ask Vikrant about being the devil and his appearance at his house, where he tells that he assumed the getup of the devil in order to flush out the real devil out. Later, Vikrant reveals a bigger fact about Sanju, leaving everyone shocked. At night, another attempt is made to kill Vikrant which fails again. Vikrant deduces that Eknath and Moose Kunni (who was actually killed by Eknath) are the mastermind behind Suresh Krishna's murder (based on the clue mentioned by the latter, on the 1 note), as they were involved in smuggling. With the help of Panna, Vikrant learns that the dead children's fathers are actually the classmates of Madhava and Raghava, the children of Nittoni. These classmates are shown to have bullied and humiliated Madhava and Raghava for their caste identity and poor status, and also attacked them on the night of village attack on Nittoni. Panna also shares that as per the account of an old villageman, the same encrypted writing found on the corpses of children were found near the dead bodies of Nittoni's family as well. Another sentence vowing to finish the lives of those who killed Nittoni's family was also found in that note, according to the old villager.

Vikrant and Panna also find out that only 4 dead bodies were found at the time of Nittoni family's death and deduce that Madhava is still alive and may be responsible for the killings. After meeting Lawrence Pinto on another occasion, Vikrant sees a Shiva tattoo on his chest and deduces there is something suspicious there. He goes to Pinto's house to interrogate him, but Pinto makes an escape through a way the local driver tells Vikrant leads to the abandoned temple where Nittoni was the caretaker. In the Kamarottu house, Panna and Munna discusses amongst themselves that since the children of all classmates of Madhava were killed, now Panna, and Munna, and Sanju would be the killer's next target as their fathers also took part in persecuting Nittoni's family before knowing the truth that Sanju stole the jewels. Panna and Munna are suddenly terrorised by Deyyu, and are abducted by an unknown man. Vikrant reaches the abandoned temple, where he chances upon the names and belongings of all dead children. It is revealed that Vikrant's daughter was also one among the victims (the girl who is shown to be kidnapped in the beginning) and her presence with him shown all throughout the movie was only his post-traumatic hallucination. The kidnapping and murder incident had also left Vikrant's wife in coma and he had actually come to Kamarottu to investigate these murders. Vikrant is shown to have been one among Madhava's classmates, and though he had never actively bullied Madhava and Raghava, he had not tried to protect them from other bullies either. For this very reason, he has suffered personal loss of his wife and daughter Geethanjali "Guddi" in the hands of Madhava, who is on a mission to exact vengeance on the people directly/indirectly responsible for ill-treating his family.
Vikrant's deduction that Madhava is none other than Lawrence Pinto is right. Madhava knocks out Vikrant and takes him to an underground tunnel, where Panna, Munna are about to be hung. Here it is revealed that the his wife was attacked and daughter killed while they were visiting through the village for a marriage.

Upon gaining consciousness, Vikrant also deduces that Madhava's younger brother Raghava is also alive. Then Sanju arrives, and it is revealed, to everybody's astonishment, that he is actually Raghava. Raghava has been masquerading as Sanju, and Raghava had caught and killed the real Sanju for stealing the jewelry of the temple, on the very same night of the death of his parents and sister. An enraged Vikrant fights with both Raghava and Madhava, which leads to Madhava and Deyyu getting killed. Raghava fights with Vikrant, with Vikrant gaining the upper hand. He kills and throws Raghava into a waterfall, thus avenging his personal loss. Panna and Munna are reunited with Vishwanath, where Vikrant keeps Raghava/Sanju's death as a secret from Sakhu, on Janardhan's request.

Cast 

Sudeepa as Inspector Vikrant "Vicky" Rona
Nirup Bhandari as Sanjeev "Sanju" Gambhira
 Neetha Ashok as Aparna Ballal aka Panna
Jacqueline Fernandez as Racquel D'Coasta / Gadang Rakkamma /Sapna
 Ravishankar Gowda as Vishwanath Ballal
 Madhusudan Rao as Janardhan Gambhira
V. Priya as Shantha "Shaku" Gambhira
 Vasuki Vaibhav as Baalakrishna "Baalu"
Siddu Moolimani as Mohanchandra "Munna" Ballal
 Ramm Bogadi as Mahabala 
Chitkala Biradar as Baby Ballal
Milana Nagaraj as Renu Rona, Vikrant's wife
Samhitha as Geethanjali "Guddi" Rona, Vikrant Rona's daughter 
Ramesh Kukkuvalli as Eknath Gambhira
Vajradheer Jain as Lawrence Pinto
Dushyanth Rai as Moose Kunni
Karthik Rao Kordale as Fakruddin aka Pakru
Ranjan Shetty as Rudramani Bhavikatte
Vishwanatha KC as Manche Gowda
Yogish Shetty as Nittoni, Madhava and Raghava's father
Achinthya Puranik as Young Sanju
Anup Bhandari as Old Photographer (cameo)

Production

Development 
Sudeepa and Anup Bhandari were to collaborate for a project titled Billa Ranga Baasha; however, the film was put on hold as Sudeepa heard another script from Anup Bandari. Sudeepa decided to produce the film with newcomers playing the lead roles but decided that he himself will star in the film after listening to the script. Vikrant Rona is produced by Manjunath Gowda's Shalini Arts. Alankar Pandian of Invenio Origin joined the film as a co-producer.

Filming 
Primary photoshoot began on 1 March 2020, and filming started on 2 March at Hyderabad under the title Phantom. Actor Sudeepa began filming Kotigobba 3 and Phantom simultaneously. The producers originally planned to cast Sudeep's nephew Sanchith Sanjeev, but went with Nirup Bhandari instead. When the team preparing for second schedule COVID-19 pandemic hits badly and the works stopped. On 13 June, the crew announced they would resume shooting in July.

Then on 16 July 2020, they resumed their work amid pandemic at Annapurna Studios, Hyderabad, by constructing huge dense forest set. Most of the filming done in Annapurna Studios and Ramoji Film City Hyderabad. Other shoots were done in Malshej Ghat, Mahabaleshwar and Kerala. This was the first Kannada movie to use the advanced real-time 3D creation tool Unreal Engine.

Casting 
Jacqueline Fernandez was roped in to play a prominent role along with a song appearance, while Anup Bhandari's brother Nirup Bhandari and other actors and actresses like Neetha Ashok, Ravishankar Gowda, Madhusudhan Rao and Vasuki Vaibhav appear in other pivotal roles.

Music 

Music director B. Ajaneesh Loknath composed the songs and background music for the movie and its his first collaboration with actor Sudeepa. The music rights of the film are owned by Lahari Music and T-Series.

Release

Theatrical 
The film was released worldwide on 28 July 2022 with 3D version in more than 3000 screens. Earlier the film was scheduled to release on 19 August 2021. However, it was postponed due to the COVID-19 pandemic to 24 February 2022, and later to 28 July 2022. In addition to the original Kannada, the film was dubbed and released in Tamil, Hindi, Telugu, and Malayalam and other languages. The film released in 3000 screens including 450 in Karnataka. The film was released in 87 screens in Kolkata.

The film was initially planned to be made on a budget of 15 crore, however, the budget was increased to 95 crore due to the scale of the film with including promotional budget . The Telugu version was released in 370 screens in the first week and continued to be screened in 320 theatres in the second week.

Distribution 
The Hindi version of the film is distributed by Salman Khan Films and PVR Pictures all over North India. The Middle East region rights have been bought by One Twenty 8 Media. The Kerala distribution rights of the film are acquired by Dulquer Salmaan's Wayfarer Films. The Tamil Nadu distribution rights of the film was acquired by Zee Studios while the Andhra Pradesh and Telangana distribution rights were acquired by Cosmos Entertainment.

Home media 
The satellite and digital rights of the Kannada version have been purchased by Zee Kannada and ZEE5, respectively. It was officially announced by Zee Kannada head Raghavendra Hunsur in his channel's show, Zee Kutumba Awards in 2021. The film digitally streamed on ZEE5 on 2 September 2022. The Hindi, Tamil and Telugu versions were digitally streamed on Disney+ Hotstar from 16 September 2022.

Reception

Critical reception
Renuka Vyavahare of The Times of India gave the film 3 out of 5 and wrote "Vikrant Rona could evolve into a decent mystery series ahead packed with more dark adventures if the makers get rid of the unnecessary fluff. With so much potential, we wish this mysterious fantasy had risen to the occasion sooner." Shrishti Negi of News18 gave the film's rating 3 out of 5 and wrote "Overall, Vikrant Rona is a treat for hardcore Kiccha Sudeep fans who have been waiting for this film with bated breath. The film releases in theatres today."

Shubhra Gupta of The Indian Express rated the film 1.5 out of 5 stars and wrote "The convoluted plot and stilted dialogues of this Kiccha Sudeep-starrer mar the experience". A critic for Bollywood Hungama rated the film 1.5 out of 5 stars and wrote "VIKRANT RONA fails to impress due to the poor script, direction and length". Bharathi Pradhan of Lehren rated the film 1.5 out of 5 stars and wrote "Vikrant will even sing you a lullaby. Whether in Kannada or Hindi, you'll go zzzzz". Saibal Chatterjee of NDTV rated the film 2 out of 5 stars and wrote "Vikrant Rona isn't interested in specificities. It seeks to overwhelm with the scale of its ambition. It falls well short of greatness but never stops trying". Nandini Ramnath of Scroll.in rated the film 2 out of 5 stars and wrote "Focused on creating a visually evocative setting and showcasing leading man Sudeep's cool moves, Vikrant Rona is happy to miss the wood for the trees". Deepa Gahlot of Rediff rated the film 2 out of 5 stars and wrote "The plot keeps getting weirder by the minute, and scenes leapfrog round with no control. The end result is bafflement and boredom". Rohit Bhatnagar of The Free Press Journal rated the film 2 out of 5 stars and wrote "The film has an interesting premise, but it's weaker on the screenplay front and does not hold your attention for long". Sowmya Rajendran of The News Minute rated the film 2.5 out of 5 stars and wrote "Vikrant Rona has been marketed as an "action adventure fantasy" film — but strangely, it doesn't fall into any of the three genres". A critic for The Hans India rated the film 2 out of 5 stars and wrote "Except for the lavish sets and proceedings, the film fell low on emotions. In trying to emulate his predecessors, Anup Bhandari failed to recreate the emotions which impacted him badly". Subham Kulkarni of Koimoi gave the film 2.5 out of 5 stars and wrote "Vikrant Rona is indeed a unique film but with lot of things that can kill the impact. Maybe call this one a stepping stone to a comic book inspired universe that will be amazing someday."

Soundarya Athimuthu of The Quint rated the film 2.5 out of 5 stars and wrote "Vikrant Rona tries to be smart with its detailing in the plot".

Box office
The film grossed ₹35 crores on the first day including ₹16 crores to ₹17.8 crores from Karnataka alone. The first day domestic net collections were reported to be around ₹19.6 crores. The Hindi version collected ₹1 crore nett on the first day which was reported to be higher than the Hindi dubbed versions of Vikram, 777 Charlie, Beast and Valimai. The Telugu version grossed ₹2 crores on the opening day. On the second day, the Hindi version collected ₹75 lakhs in northern belt which was reported to be more than the second day collection of Vikram in North India. The film was reported to have collected ₹55–₹60 crores in two days from all its versions. The three-day worldwide collection was estimated to be around ₹80– ₹85 crores. The film was reported to have collected ₹20 to ₹25 crores on second day and ₹23 to ₹25 crores on third day. The film collected ₹25 crores to ₹29 crores on the fourth day.The Indian Express reported the four-day weekend collection to be ₹ 95 crores and The Telegraph reported it to be ₹96 crores while The Times of India estimated it to be around ₹ 105 crores. According to News 18, the film grossed ₹110 crores in four days whereas Hindustan Times estimated it to be around ₹115–₹120 crores. The Hindi version was reported to have collected ₹5.96 crores in first four days. By the end of fifth day, the worldwide gross was estimated to be around ₹110 crores to ₹134 crores. The Telugu Version was reported to have grossed ₹10 crores in six days. The film was reported to have grossed ₹5.5–6 crore on the seventh day. Though few sources reported that the film grossed ₹158.5 crores in seven days, other sources reported that the film crossed the ₹150 crore mark in 8 days. The film grossed ₹3 crore on day 10 and ₹3.5 crore on day 11. The total 11 day collection of the Hindi version was reported to be around ₹9.7 crores. However, The Indian Express reported that the 11 day worldwide gross of the film from all five versions to be ₹86 crore based on a report by consultancy firm Ormax Media which had considered collections until July end but published in mid-August. The film collected ₹1 crore each on Day 12 and Day 13. The film was reported to have grossed ₹200 crores at the end of two weeks thereby becoming the third Kannada film to reach that milestone after K.G.F: Chapter 1 and K.G.F: Chapter 2. At the end of 16 days, it was reported that the film collected ₹14 crores nett from the Hindi version and ₹7.5 crores nett from the Telugu version. Zee News and WION reported that the film had grossed ₹210 crores at the end of 27 days.

Sequel
In an interview with News 18, Sudeepa had asserted a possibility of a sequel to Vikrant Rona.

Notes

References

External links
 
 

Indian action thriller films
Indian 3D films
Films shot in Palakkad
Films shot in Ottapalam
2022 action thriller films
2020s Kannada-language films